Angaar is a 2016 Indo-Bangladeshi  romantic action musical film, directed by Wazed Ali Sumon and produced by Abdul Aziz under the banner of Jaaz Multimedia. The film features a cast that includes Om and Jolly in lead roles while Ashish Vidyarthi plays the role of the main antagonist. The first teaser of the film was released on December 15, 2015 and the film was first released on January 15, 2016. The movie is a remake of 2013 Kannada film Appayya.

Synopsis
A northeastern village in Bangladesh far isolated from the modern society, where love is a crime and punishable by death, two individuals falls in love and embraces it, even after knowing the conclusion of their fate and life.

Cast
 Om as Bishu
 Falguni Rahman Jolly as Maya
 Ashish Vidyarthi as Swapan Sarkar
 Amit Hasan
 Rajatava Dutta as Surjo Mandal
 Rabiul Islam
 Ahmed Sharif
 Kharaj Mukherjee

Production

Development
In May 2015, production company Jaaz Multimedia announced a project with newly introduced actress Jolly in a lead role. Later in the month, Om was cast as the lead male protagonist while Ashish Vidyarthi, Amit Hasan, and Rajatava Dutta were cast to play the main antagonists in the film.

Filming
Principal photography began during June 2015 with Jolly in Dhaka. Om, Ashish Vidyarthi, Amit Hasan and Rajatava Dutta joined the filming in Bandarban from September 2015. Later that month, the first song from the film was shot in Bandarban. The filming officially came to an end during November 2015.

Soundtrack
Angaar's film soundtrack album is composed by Ahmed Imtiaz Bulbul, Akaash and Emon Saha.

Reception
The album gained popularity among audiences and critics. The first track,  Kotobar Bojhabo,  was a  hit after its release. The track was composed by Akaash and sung by Mohammed Irfan.

Release
Angaar was released in Bangladesh and India on 15 January 2016 in more than 170 screens. The film was distributed by Jaaz Multimedia in Bangladesh while Eskay Movies was
given the distribution rights in India.

References

2016 films
2016 action films
2010s Bengali-language films
2010s romantic musical films
2016 romantic drama films
2010s romantic musical films
Bangladeshi romantic drama films
Bengali-language Bangladeshi films
Bengali-language Indian films
Films shot in Bangladesh
Films shot in Chittagong Division
Films shot in Sylhet Division
2010s musical drama films
Bangladeshi remakes of Indian films
Films scored by Ahmed Imtiaz Bulbul
Films scored by Emon Saha
Films scored by Akassh
Films about feuds
Films directed by Wajed Ali Sumon
Jaaz Multimedia films